Gorf is an arcade video game released in 1981 by Midway Manufacturing, whose name was advertised as an acronym for "Galactic Orbiting Robot Force". It is a fixed shooter with five distinct levels, the first of which is based on Space Invaders and another on Galaxian. The game makes heavy use of synthesized speech for the Gorfian robot which teases the player, powered by the Votrax speech chip. Gorf allows the player to buy 2 additional lives per quarter before starting the game, for a maximum of 7 lives.

The home ports omit the Galaxians stage for copyright reasons.

Gameplay 

Gorf is a fixed shooter in which the players take control of an unnamed starship from the Interstellar Space Force, capable of moving freely on all directions around the lower third of the screen, in an attempt to prevent the Gorfian Empire from conquering Earth.  Gameplay comprises five distinct missions; each mission presents its own distinct playstyle, but the central goal of each is to destroy all enemies. Successfully completing all five missions increases the player's rank, which represents the current difficulty level of the game, and loops back to the first mission. Gameplay continues until the player loses all of their lives.

Before starting a new game, players can buy up to seven additional lives by purchasing more credits; an extra life is also granted after clearing the first five missions. Unlike similar games where the player can only fire their weapon after an existing shot has disappeared from the screen, the ship is equipped with a laser cannon capable of firing a single vertical shot (called a "quark laser") at any time, although doing so causes the previous shot to disappear.

Players can advance through the ranks of Space Cadet, Space Captain, Space Colonel, Space General, Space Warrior and Space Avenger, which increases the speed and difficulty of the game and introduces more enemy patterns. Along the way, a robotic voice heckles and threatens the player, often calling and mocking the player by their current rank (for example, "Some galactic defender you are, Space Cadet!"). Depending on the version, the player's current rank is displayed via a series of integrated lit panels on the cabinet.

Missions 
 Astro Battles: A clone of Space Invaders; it is the only mission that takes place on Earth instead of space. 24 enemies attack in the classic pattern set by the original game; however, the player is protected by a parabolic force field that switches off temporarily when the player's shots pass through it and is gradually worn away by enemy fire.
 Laser Attack: The first mission set in space, where the player must battle two formations of five enemies. Each formation contains three yellow enemies that attempt to dive-bomb the player, a white gunner that fires a single laser beam stream, and a red miniature version of the Gorf robot.
 Galaxians: As the name implies, this mission is a clone of Galaxian, with the key differences being the number of enemies and the way enemies fire against the player. Gameplay is otherwise similar to the original game.
 Space Warp: This mission places the player in a sort of wormhole, where enemies fly outward from the center of the screen and attempt to either shoot down or collide with the player's ship.  It is possible to destroy enemy shots in this level.
 Flag Ship:  The Flag Ship is protected by its own force field, similar to the one protecting the player in Mission 1, and it flies back and forth firing at the player. To defeat it, the player must break through the force field and destroy the ship's core. As with the alien ship in Phoenix, the bottom of the flag ship must be blasted away to expose the vulnerable core. If a different part of the ship is hit, the player receives bonus points, and the part breaks off and flies in a random direction, potentially posing a risk to the player's ship. When the player successfully hits the core, the Flag Ship explodes in a dramatic display, the player advances to the next rank, and play continues on Mission 1, with the difficulty increased. Later encounters with the Flag Ship on higher ranks include additional enemies during the mission.

Development 
Gorf was originally intended to be a tie-in with Star Trek: The Motion Picture but after reading the film's script, the game designers realized that the concept would not work as a video game; however, the player's ship still resembles the Starship Enterprise. The underlying hardware platform for Gorf allowed arcade operators to easily swap the pattern, CPU and RAM boards with other similar games such as Wizard of Wor, since only the game logic and ROM boards are specific to each game. The name of the game is also Frog spelled backwards; "Frog" was the nickname of designer Jamie Fenton during college.

Release 
Gorf was released in North America in February 1981 and, notably, became one of the first titles to use synthesised speech (powered by the Votrax speech chip) as well as one of the first games to feature multiple screens.

Ports 
Gorf was ported to the Atari 8-bit family, Atari 2600, Atari 5200, BBC Micro, ColecoVision, Commodore 64, and VIC-20 by multiple developers between 1982 and 1983. Because of copyright issues, the Galaxians mission was removed from almost all versions. The Commodore 64 port is the only one that features synthesized speech via the Magic Voice Speech module.

Reception 

The arcade version reached the top of the US Play Meter arcade charts in September 1981. The Atari 2600 version of the game received a Certificate of Merit in the category of "Best Solitaire Video Game" at the 4th annual Arkie Awards, and received the "1984 Best Computer Game Audio-Visual Effects" award at the 5th Arkies the following year. At the 5th Arkies the judges pointed out that the Atari versions had out-polled both the ColecoVision and Commodore 64 versions of the game, and they suggested that it is the game's "varied action" that "keeps players coming back again and again."

Regarding the VIC-20 version, Electronic Games wrote that "this fast-moving colorful entry is a must ... one of the best games available for the VIC-20", and Ahoy! stated that the VIC-20 version "still has my vote for the best of the bunch ... The graphics are excellent".

Gorf is included in the 2010 book 1001 Video Games You Must Play Before You Die.

Legacy 
A planned sequel, Ms. Gorf, was never released. It was programmed in the programming language Forth. The source code for the prototype is owned by Jamie Fenton. The game exists only as source code stored on a set of 8-inch floppy disks, and would require access to a development environment that no longer exists in order to compile it into executable machine code.

In 2006, an unlicensed port of Gorf was released for the Atari Jaguar CD by hobbyist developer 3D Stooges Software Studios. Another hobbyist clone for the Game Boy Advance was made available in 2010. Other independent developers have also created titles influenced by Gorf on other platforms.

Competitive play 
On July 8, 2019, Matthew Garrett set a new world record score in Gorf of 1,543,160 points, recognized by Twin Galaxies. His game spanned 953 missions across 6 hours 41 minutes. Garrett holds the world record for both the arcade 3 & 6 life settings and is the first person recorded to reach mission 500 (having beaten each of the 5 individual levels 100 times) without losing a life. The previous world record was set by Keith Swanson in 2011 with a score of 1,129,660.

See also 
Stratovox (1980), first arcade game with synthesized voice

References

External links 
 Gorf at GameFAQs
 
 Gorf at MobyGames

1981 video games
Arcade video games
Atari 8-bit family games
Atari 2600 games
Atari 5200 games
BBC Micro and Acorn Electron games
ColecoVision games
Commodore 64 games
VIC-20 games
Fixed shooters
Midway video games
Video games about robots
Video games developed in the United States